The British Virgin Islands (BVI) are one of three political divisions of the Virgin Islands archipelago located in the Lesser Antilles, between the Caribbean Sea and the North Atlantic Ocean.  The BVI  are the easternmost part of the island chain. The land area totals (about 0.9 times the size of Washington, DC) and comprises 16 inhabited and more than 20 uninhabited islands. The islands of Tortola, Anegada, Virgin Gorda and Jost van Dyke are the largest. Maritime claims include  territorial sea and a  exclusive fishing zone. In terms of land use, it is 20% arable land, 6.67% permanent crops and 73.33% other as of a 2005 figure.
It has strong ties to nearby U.S. Virgin Islands and Puerto Rico.

Terrain 

The majority of the islands are steep and hilly due to their volcanic origin. Other than Anegada, the islands are composed of pyroclastic rock and mixed deposits of diorite and tonalite Anegada is geologically distinct, being composed of carbonate reef deposits. The entire archipelago, together with Puerto Rico to the west, is the above-water high points on an underwater ridge that was once a continuous land mass during the Pleistocene epoch. This bank formed from tectonic forces at the boundary where the Caribbean Plate collides with the North American Plate.

Settlements
The capital of the territory and the main port of entry for yachts and cruise ships visiting the BVI is Road Town on Tortola.  In 2010, The United Nations found that 83% or the BVI population lived on Tortola, making Road Town the largest population center of the islands.

Spanish Town on Virgin Gorda, also known as "The Valley", is the second largest settlement and the original capital of the territory. Virgin Gorda was mined for copper in the 17th through 19th centuries but declined when the mine closed in 1867. The creation of a yacht harbour and resort by Laurance Rockefeller in the early 1960's turned Spanish Town into a wealthy tourist destination.

Residents on Jost van Dyke, Anegada, Cooper lsland, Great Camanoe Island and other locations collectively make up just over 2% of the population.

Climate 
The British Virgin Islands have a tropical savanna climate, moderated by the trade winds. Temperatures vary little throughout the year. Rainfall can be quite variable, but the wettest months on average are September to November and the driest months on average are February and March. Hurricanes occasionally hit the islands, with the hurricane season running from June to November.

See also
List of Caribbean islands#British Virgin Islands

References